Wild Wild Wonderland is the sixth studio album and the major-label international debut studio album from the Finnish singer Saara Aalto, released under Warner Music. The album was released on 27 April 2018, prior to Aalto's participation in the Eurovision Song Contest 2018.

Track listing

Charts

References

2018 albums
Saara Aalto albums